LOOKSfilm is a German film production company, based in Leipzig, Berlin, Hanover and Halle (Saale).

The company was founded in 1995 by Gunnar Dedio. It develops, produces and distributes series as well as documentary and feature films for the international market. LOOKSfilm possesses its own archives department, which researches and restores photo and film material for historical productions. Furthermore, LOOKSfilm operates as a music publisher and is the initiator of event productions.

Productions
In 2004, for the 15th anniversary of the Fall of the Berlin Wall, LOOKSfilm produced the series Life Behind the Wall, which was awarded the Adolf-Grimme-Preis. Accompanied by archive material and newly developed amateur films, photos and documents, contemporary witnesses have their say. Their different perspectives and stories trace a personal image of the GDR.

The company co-produced Age of Uprising: The Legend of Michael Kohlhaas, starring Mads Mikkelsen and Bruno Ganz. Arnaud des Pallières' adaptation of the Kleist-Novella Michael Kohlhaas was nominated for the 2013 Palme d'Or at the Cannes Film Festival. In 2014, the film won the French César Award for Best Sound and Best Music.

Based on diaries and letters, the international co-production 14 – Diaries of the Great War (2014) retold the experiences of real people as dramas and interwoven these with archive material. 14 – Diaries of the Great War was the first production by LOOKSfilm for which Netflix acquired license rights. More LOOKSfilm productions and co-productions followed, such as: My Friend Rockefeller (2015), The Cuba Libre Story (2016), and Age of Tanks (2018). With Bobby Kennedy for President (2018), LOOKSfilm co-produced with Netflix directly, among others.

In 2017, LOOKSfilm produced the documentary film Hitler's Hollywood. The film, directed by Rüdiger Suchsland, examines the significance of German cinema during the Nazi era. Based on selected film clips, the film illustrates how the German film industry aimed at creating a second Hollywood. Between 1933 and 1945, the roughly 1,000 Nazi productions served not only as entertainment, but also as a tool for the indoctrination of the population.

Clash of Futures (2018), the continuation of 14 – Diaries of the Great War, recounts the interwar period in Europe on the basis of 13 fates. As of 2019, it is the company's largest international co-production, with over 20 international partners and channels.

Filmography 

 2001: Hangman – Death has a face (theatrical documentary, directed by Jens Becker)
 2003: Genesis II et l'homme créa la nature (documentary series, directed by Frédéric Lepage)
 2003: Checkmate (documentary, awarded the Romy
 2004: Life Behind the Wall (documentary series, won the Grimme-Preis in 2005)
 2004: Monuments (documentary series, directed by Piotr Trzaskalski, Alice Nellis, Peter Kerekes, Ferenc Török and others)
 2006: Life Under Napoleon (documentary series)
 2007: Living with the Enemy (documentary series)
 2007: Hitler & Mussolini (documentary)
 2008: Life in East Prussia (documentary series)
 2008: Hitler & Stalin (documentary)
 2008: In Search of America (documentary series)
 2008: Of Sharks and Men (documentary series, directed by Dirk Steffens)
 2009: Comrade Couture (documentary)
 2010: Molotow (documentary, directed by Ullrich Kasten)
 2010: Life After the Wall (documentary series)
 2010: La vie sauvage des animaux domestiques (documentary)
 2010: Mein Germany (documentary)
 2010: On the Road in Southern Africa (documentary series)
 2010: Hans Zimmer – The Sound of Hollywood (documentary)
 2011: Churchill's betrayal of Poland – The Mysterious Death of General Sikorski (documentary)
 2011: Brick by Brick – The Making of the Iron Curtain (documentary)
 2012: Hindenburg & Hitler (documentary, directed by Christoph Weinert)
 2012: Lenin – The End of the Myth (documentary, directed by Ullrich Kasten)
 2013: Michael Kohlhaas (feature film, directed by Arnaud des Pallières), awarded two Césars (for Best Music and Best Sound) at the 39th César Awards.
 2013: Spies of Mississippi (documentary, directed by Dawn Porter)
 2013: Michel Petrucciani – Body and Soul (documentary, directed by Michael Radford)
 2013: Lyndon B. Johnson- Succeeding Kennedy (documentary)
 2013: 1913: The Emperor's Last Dance (documentary)
 2014: 14 – Diaries of the Great War (documentary drama series, directed by Jan Peter)
 2014: Small Hands in a Big War (drama series for children, directed by Matthias Zirzow)
 2014: Inside the War (3D documentary, directed by Niko Vialkowitsch)
 2014: Annihilation (documentary series, directed by William Karel)
 2015: Erich Mielke – Master of Fear (scenic documentary, directed by Jens Becker, Maarten van der Duin)
 2016: The Cuba Libre Story (documentary drama series, director/written by: Emmanuel Amara, Kai Christiansen, Florian Dedio)
 2016: My friend Rockefeller (documentary, directed/written by: Steffi Kammerer)
 2016: A Gentle Creature (feature film, directed by: Sergei Loznitsa)
 2017: Dreams of a New World (documentary drama series, directed by Kai Christiansen)
 2017: Mademoiselle Paradis (feature film, directed by: Barbara Albert)
 2018: Bobby Kennedy for President (documentary, directed by Dawn Porter)
 2018: Clash of Futures (documentary drama series, directed by Jan Peter)

Awards 
 2019: Der weiße Elefant (for Kids of Courage)
 2019: Civis Media Prize in the category "Entertainment (fictional)" (for Clash of Futures)
 2019: nominated for Banff World Media Festival Rockie Awards (for Kids of Courage)
 2019: nominated for Grimme-Preis (for Clash of Futures)
 2015: Prix Italia, Special Mention for International TV Coproduction (for 14 – Diaries of the Great War)
 2014: nominated for German Television Award (for 14 – Diaries of the Great War)
 2014: nominated for Japan Prize (International Contest for Educational Media) in the category "Continuing Education" (for 14 – Diaries of the Great War)
 2014: nominated for Japan Prize (International Contest for Educational Media) in the category "Youth" (for Small Hands in a Big War)
 2005: Grimme-Preis (for Life Behind the Wall)
 2003: Romy TV-Award (for Checkmate – The Superpowers Behind the Rumanian Revolution)
 2000: Axel-Springer-Preis (for Fit for Jesus)

References

External links
 

Film production companies of Germany
1995 establishments in Germany